De Fûke  is a 2000 Frisian film directed by Steven de Jong. The film is based on the 1966 book, written by Rink van der Velde.

Cast
 Rense Westra - Jelle
 Syb van der Ploeg - JP
 Steven de Jong – Germ
 Peter Tuinman - Detective
 Hidde Maas -Mayor
 Hilbert Dykstra - adjudant
 Joop Wittermans – Salesman
 Cynthia Abma – Mirjam
 Jan Arendsz – de maat

External links 
 

Dutch war drama films
2000 films
Frisian-language films